This is a list of the governors, agents, and presidents of colonial Madras, initially of the English East India Company, up to the end of British colonial rule in 1947.

English Agents

In 1639, the grant of Madras to the English was finalized between the factors of the Masulipatnam (now Machilipatnam) factory (trading post), represented by Francis Day, and the Raja of Chandragiri. In 1640, Andrew Cogan, the chief of the Masulipatnam factory, made his way to Madras in the company of Francis Day and the English and Indian employees of the Masulipatnam factory. The Agency of Madras was established on 1 March 1640 and Cogan was made the first Agent. The official title was 'Governor of Fort St George' and the Governor was usually referred to as Agent. Cogan served in the post for three years and was succeeded by Francis Day. After four agents had served their terms, Madras was upgraded to a Presidency during the time of Aaron Baker. However financial considerations forced the company to revert to an agency soon after Aaron Baker had served his term. The Agency survived until 1684 when Madras was made a Presidency once and for all. Streynsham Master is the best remembered and most renowned of the Agents of Madras.

Presidents
Madras was elevated to a presidency in 1684 and remained so until 12 February 1785 when new rules and regulations brought by the Pitt's India Act reformed the administration of the East India Company with the exception of a three-year period of French rule from 1746 to 1749 when Madras was a governorship.

Subsequently, Elihu Yale who took charge on 8 August 1684 was the First President of Madras. Elihu Yale, Thomas Pitt and George Macartney are some of the well-known Presidents of Madras.

Governors of the French East India Company
In 1746, Dupleix's deputy, La Bordannais laid siege to Madras and captured the city. For the next three years, Madras remained under French Governors, until 1749, when Madras was handed to the British as per the Treaty of Aix-la-Chappele. The illustrious Mahe de la Bordannais served as acting Governor for a few months until the appointment of Governor Jean-Jacques Duval d'Eprémesnil, who served until 1749 when Madras reverted to British rule.

Presidents of the British East India Company
During the period between 1746 and 1749, when Madras was under French rule, the British ran a provisional government from Fort St. David, near modern-day Porto Novo. In 1752, when Madras had been returned to the British, the then President of Madras, John Saunders, shifted the seat of government from Fort David to Madras.  The British gained a lot of territory during the mid-18th century, so that by the time the French military power was crushed at the Battle of Wandiwash in 1761, the territory under the Presidency of Madras had increased manyfold. In 1785, the Province of Madras was created and the President became the Governor of Madras.

Governors (of British India)

References

External links

Madras Presidency
History of Chennai
Tamil Nadu politics-related lists
India history-related lists